The Children's Creativity Museum is an interactive museum for children aged 2-12 years, located in Yerba Buena Gardens, in San Francisco, California. It offers workshops and exhibits that allow children to produce their own media through various interactive, creative processes: stop motion animation, programming robots, music video production, design challenges, art projects, and more. It has around 100,000 museum visitors annually (as of 2016/17). The Children's Creativity Museum is a nonprofit 501(c)(3) organization, with annual revenues of around $2.1 million (as of 2016/17), including $600,000 of funding from the city of San Francisco.

History
The Children's Creativity Museum opened as Zeum on October 31, 1998 as part of a major  urban renewal project in the South of Market area by the San Francisco Redevelopment Agency. It is housed in a two-story building, constructed on top of the Moscone Convention Center, which includes a 200-seat theatre and 3,000 square feet of exhibition space.  The museum includes a 1906 carousel by Charles I. D. Looff.

Zeum changed its name to Children's Creativity Museum in 2011 to increase awareness about the museum's purpose. In a press release announcing the name change, it stated: "Although the name Zeum sounded fun, it didn't provide parents with any clues about what they and their children would experience. With that understanding, our verbal branding team identified two primary goals the new name needed to accomplish: It had to be descriptive enough to indicate who it was for, but also suggestive enough to encompass the broad range of imaginative activities participants could take part in. After vetting over 200 names with Zeum leadership, it was agreed that the name "Children's Creativity Museum" accomplished both goals."

Exhibits
In the Animation Studio, children can mold clay characters and make their own stop-motion animation movie.  In this exhibit, museum educators introduce film making concepts: making a storyboard, building the characters, and producing a stop-motion animation.  Afterward, visitors can stop by one of five stop-motion animation stations, choose different set backdrops to set the scene, and capture their footage frame by frame using a video camera.  Once the movie is complete, copies of the video are emailed to visitors.

In the Tech Lab, children are introduced to coding by learning how to program a robot to complete a series of tasks, navigate mazes, and play games. Each activity is designed to promote creative problem-solving in novice programmers. More experienced coders can program robots to respond to sensor inputs and use loops to avoid obstacles.

In the Innovation Lab, visitors are invited to put their problem-solving and critical thinking skills to the test in working with basic, limited materials to create a prototype for a solution to a problem.

In the Making Music Studio, visitors experiment with instruments and original sounds to make music.  Your original music creation changes as you move from one area of the exhibit to another.  Families will discover that music comes from unexpected places.  Your original score is available to download and take home.

References

External links

 
 Fatherly (2016)
 Happy Trips 2016
 Thinkfun (2017)
 San Francisco Chronicle  (2016)
 Hoodline (2015)
 5 Great Indoor Escapes in the Bay Area (2010)
 San Francisco Chronicle Bay Area Clinging on its Classic Carousels (2009)
 San Francisco's Yerba Buena: Best City Scene (2009)
 Forbes: Top Travel Spots For Game Fans (2008)
 SF Weekly: Best Place for Kids (2005)
 SF Curbed San Francisco (2017)

Museums in San Francisco
Children's museums in California
Technology museums in California
South of Market, San Francisco